Rhombophyllum is a genus of succulent plants in the ice plant family, Aizoaceae. Members of the genus are native to southern Africa.

Species
Rhombophyllum albanense (L.Bolus) H.E.K.Hartmann
Rhombophyllum dolabriforme Schwantes
Rhombophyllum dyeri (L.Bolus) H.E.K.Hartmann
Rhombophyllum nelii Schwantes
Rhombophyllum rhomboideum (Salm-Dyck) Schwantes

References

 
Aizoaceae genera